Robert Mack (1 July 1959 – 4 July 2020) was an Austrian ice hockey player. He competed in the men's tournament at the 1988 Winter Olympics.

References

External links
 
 

1959 births
2020 deaths
Austrian ice hockey goaltenders
Olympic ice hockey players of Austria
Ice hockey players at the 1988 Winter Olympics
Sportspeople from Klagenfurt
EHC Black Wings Linz players
EC KAC players